The Hamriyah Free Zone is a free zone place in the city of Sharjah in the United Arab Emirates. Established by an Emiri decree in November, 1995, the Free Zone is 24 square kilometers in size and has a 14 meter deep port and 7 meter deep inner harbor. Sharjah is the only emirate which has ports on the Arabian Gulf's west coast and east coast with direct access to the Indian Ocean. Sharjah is the third largest emirate in the UAE.

See also
 List of company registers
H.E Dr. Rashid Alleem
Sharjah Electricity and Water Authority

References

External links
Gulfnews.com
Khaleejtimes.com
Khaleejtimes.com
Hamriyah Free Zone's Official website
Gulfnews.com

Sharjah (city)
Free-trade zones of the United Arab Emirates